McLain Ward (born October 17, 1975) is an American show jumping competitor and four-time Olympic medalist.

At the 2004 Olympic Games in Athens, Ward won the team jumping gold medal for the United States, together with Peter Wylde, Beezie Madden, and Chris Kappler. He again won team jumping gold at the 2008 Olympic Games, riding Sapphire alongside teammates Laura Kraut, Beezie Madden and Will Simpson. At the 2016 Summer Olympics, Ward won team jumping silver for the United States.

Early life
Ward was born in Mount Kisco, New York to Barney Ward and Kristine Lindsey. His hometown is Brewster, New York. He graduated from Greenwich Country Day School in 1993. His parents were professionals in the horse industry and encouraged him to ride. His father was his main business partner for much of his life. In 1990, at age 14, he became the youngest rider to win the United States Equestrian Federation's Show Jumping Derby. Later that year, he became the youngest rider to win the USET Medal Finals and became the first and youngest rider to win both titles in the same year.

Career
Ward won the Hampton Classic Grand Prix aboard his Selle Francais bay gelding, Twist Du Valon, in 1998 and 1999. They were the first rider-horse combination to win the Classic's Grand Prix back-to-back two years in a row. Ward became the youngest rider ever to reach the $1 million prize money mark in grand prix competition in 1999.

At the 2004 Olympic Games, Ward won the team jumping gold representing the United States.

Ward rode with a broken collarbone in the 2005 Samsung Super League when the United States team won the Championship.

Ward found himself at the center of controversy at the 2010 World Cup Final in Geneva, Switzerland. His mount, Sapphire, was eliminated after the second round of jumping due to hypersensitivity in her left forelimb. Sapphire was second in both rounds prior to elimination, and was at the top of the overall standings at the time of the disqualification. McLain challenged the ruling to the FEI. In July 2010, the FEI and McLain Ward agreed, to avoid extensive litigation, that Sapphire was incorrectly eliminated. However, Sapphire's disqualification from the final round of the World Cup remained in place. The FEI also decided to develop mandatory guidelines for hypersensitivity tests.

In 2010, Ward was featured in the television series A Rider's Story along with fellow Olympian Laura Kraut.

On the evening of January 14, 2012, when Ward was riding Oh d'Eole in the $30,000 Surpass Grand Prix, Ward suffered an injury, hitting his kneecap on a jump standard. Ward was to heal for eight weeks.

Ward's horse Sapphire was retired May 14, 2012 at the Devon Horse Show. That night, Ward won the $100,000 Wells Fargo Grand Prix of Devon. November 28, 2012 Ward won the $10,000 Welcome Stake aboard Ilan Ferder and Missy Clark's Zhum CW, a Dutch Warmblood (KWPN).

At the 2012 Olympics in London, Ward rode for the USA Olympic Equestrian team. He placed 29th in Individual Jumping-Final Round A, 24th in Individual Jumping-Third Qualifier, 6th in Team Jumping Final Round 2, 20th in Individual Jumping Second-Qualifier, 7th in Team Jumping Finial Round 1, 1st in Individual Jumping-Final Round, and 5th in Team Jumping-Qualification Round 1.

At the 2016 Summer Olympics, Ward again rode for the U.S. Team. His mount was HH Azur, owned by Double H Farms and Francois Mathy.  At the time of the Olympics Azur was 10.  He earned a team silver medal, and placed 9th individually.  He stepped into the role of anchor for the team on the final day of team competition after teammate Beezie Madden's horse suffered an injury.  He had near perfect rounds all week, dropping only one rail all week.

In 2017 McLain won the Longines FEI World Cup Championship.  It was his 17th appearance at the final.  The highest he had placed up till then was 2nd in 2009. He won riding his 2016 Olympic mount HH Azur, an 11 year old mare. He completed the week with no penalties after five rounds of jumping, one rail (four faults) ahead of the second place rider.

In April 2017, McLain Ward was ranked #1 in the Longines FEI world rankings for the first time.  He was ranked #1 through June 2017, but in July 2017, Kent Farrington was ranked #1 and McLain Ward was ranked #2 in the world.  This was the first time 2 American stood at the top of the Longines FEI world rankings.

Ward currently has horses of his own, as well as riding for owners such as Double H Farm of Ridgefield, Conn. As of 2018, he is now starting to train. During the World Equestrian Games in Tryon, he taught rider and teammate Adrienne Sternlicht.

Recently, Ward has won 5 Grand Prixs at the during the 2020 winter circuit in Wellington, Florida.

International Championship Results

Personal life

Ward married in October 2008. His father, Barney Ward, died in 2012 of cancer. 
His father Barney Ward was involved in the Horse Murders scandal, an insurance fraud scheme that killed horses for insurance money.  He served three years in federal prison, and three years probation. Ward has two daughters: Lilly who was born in February 2015 and Madison born in February 2020. His hobbies include golf and basketball.

References

External links
 McLain Ward's official website

1975 births
Living people
American male equestrians
Equestrians at the 2004 Summer Olympics
Equestrians at the 2008 Summer Olympics
Equestrians at the 2012 Summer Olympics
Equestrians at the 2016 Summer Olympics
Equestrians at the 2011 Pan American Games
Equestrians at the 2015 Pan American Games
Olympic gold medalists for the United States in equestrian
Olympic silver medalists for the United States in equestrian
Medalists at the 2004 Summer Olympics
Medalists at the 2008 Summer Olympics
Medalists at the 2016 Summer Olympics
People from Brewster, New York
Pan American Games gold medalists for the United States
Pan American Games bronze medalists for the United States
Pan American Games medalists in equestrian
Medalists at the 2011 Pan American Games
Medalists at the 2015 Pan American Games
Equestrians at the 2020 Summer Olympics
Medalists at the 2020 Summer Olympics